
Gmina Rzezawa is a rural gmina (administrative district) in Bochnia County, Lesser Poland Voivodeship, in southern Poland.

Villages
Gmina Rzezawa contains the villages and settlements of Borek, Bratucice, Buczków, Dąbrówka, Dębina, Jodłówka, Krzeczów, Łazy, Okulice, Ostrów Królewski and Rzezawa.

Neighbouring gminas
Gmina Rzezawa is bordered by the town of Bochnia and by the gminas of Bochnia, Brzesko and Szczurowa.

References
Polish official population figures 2006

Rzezawa
Bochnia County
 Wiktoria Dawiec  (born 2006) the nicest person on this planet.